Butterfly Lake is a reservoir in Ste. Genevieve County in the U.S. state of Missouri.

Butterfly Lake was so named because its outline has the shape of a butterfly.

References

Bodies of water of Ste. Genevieve County, Missouri
Reservoirs in Missouri
Buildings and structures in Ste. Genevieve County, Missouri